The Hyderabad BRTS is a planned bus rapid transit system for the Indian city of Hyderabad, India. One corridor has been identified for testing the BRT System. Electrically powered Articulated Buses are being proposed to be used on the corridor.

Corridor 
The following corridor was identified for BRTS 

Corridor: KPHB - JNTU - Malaysian Township - Shilparamam - Mindspace - IIIT - Financial Dist - narsingi - kokapet

References 

Transport in Hyderabad, India
Proposed bus rapid transit in India
Proposed infrastructure in Telangana